In probability theory, a branching random walk is a stochastic process that generalizes both the concept of a random walk and of a branching process.  At every generation (a point of discrete time), a branching random walk's value is a set of elements that are located in some linear space, such as the real line. Each element of a given generation can have several descendants in the next generation. The location of any descendant is the sum of its parent's location and a random variable.

This process is a spatial expansion of the Galton–Watson process. Its continuous equivalent is called branching Brownian motion.

Example
An example of branching random walk can be constructed where the branching process generates exactly two descendants for each element, a binary branching random walk. Given the initial condition that Xϵ = 0, we suppose that X1 and X2 are the two children of Xϵ. Further, we suppose that they are independent (0, 1) random variables.  Consequently, in generation 2, the random variables X1,1 and X1,2 are each the sum of X1 and a (0, 1) random variable. In the next generation, the random variables X1,2,1 and X1,2,2 are each the sum of X1,2 and a (0, 1) random variable. The same construction produces the values at successive times.

Each lineage in the infinite "genealogical tree" produced by this process, such as the sequence Xϵ, X1, X1,2, X1,2,2, ..., forms a conventional random walk.

See also

 Discrete-time dynamical system

References

Variants of random walks